Pathway Publishing Company of Aylmer, Ontario, Canada, and Lagrange, Indiana, U.S., was founded in the mid-1960s as a major publisher of Amish-written material. They are the publisher of choice of Old Order Mennonites as well, espousing more traditional views and simple living and conservative Anabaptist theology.

Pathway Publishers publishes and sells school text books (readers), scholarly research and translations, tracts, booklets, and books in English and German. They also publish a number of periodicals of interest to families and schools including the Blackboard Bulletin, Young Companion, and Family Life.

Ideologically this group shares many similar beliefs with Conservative Mennonites though differing in the use of technology like computers and electricity and not promoting Sunday Schools or Revival Meetings. They identify more with the values of the Old Order groups, but share common core values or distinctives with other Anabaptist groups. In recent years they have also shared in joint historical or scholarly publishing efforts with Eastern Mennonite Publications.

External links
 Pathway Publishers at Global Anabaptist Mennonite Encyclopedia Online
 Pathway Publishers independent distributor

Amish in Canada
Amish in Indiana
Anabaptism in Canada
German-language literature
Old Order Mennonites
Book publishing companies of Canada